Artyom Andreyevich Moskvin (born 7 May 1988) is a Russian former football goalkeeper.

Club career
He made his debut in the Russian Second Division for FC Syzran-2003 on 12 June 2011 in a game against FC Dynamo Kirov.

He played two seasons in the Russian Football National League for FC Gazovik Orenburg and FC KAMAZ Naberezhnye Chelny.

References

External links
 

1988 births
Sportspeople from Samara, Russia
Living people
Association football goalkeepers
Russian footballers
FC KAMAZ Naberezhnye Chelny players
FC Orenburg players
FC Sakhalin Yuzhno-Sakhalinsk players
PFC Krylia Sovetov Samara players
FC Avangard Kursk players